That Girl is an American sitcom that ran on ABC from September 8, 1966 to March 19, 1971. It starred Marlo Thomas as the title character, Ann Marie, an aspiring (but only sporadically employed) actress who moves from her hometown of Brewster, New York, to try to make it big in New York City. Ann has to take a number of offbeat "temp" jobs to support herself in between her various auditions and bit parts. It was one of the first sitcoms to focus on an unmarried woman who was not a domestic or living with her parents, a forerunner of The Mary Tyler Moore Show.

Ted Bessell played her boyfriend Donald Hollinger, a writer for Newsview Magazine. Lew Parker and Rosemary DeCamp played Lew Marie and Helen Marie, her concerned parents. Bernie Kopell, Ruth Buzzi, and Reva Rose played Ann and Donald's friends. That Girl was developed by writers Bill Persky and Sam Denoff, who had served as head writers on The Dick Van Dyke Show (with which Thomas' father, Danny Thomas, was closely associated) earlier in the 1960s.

Premise

The show reflected the changing roles of American women in feminist-era America. Thomas' goofy charm, together with Bessell's dry wit, made That Girl a solid performer on the ABC Television Network, and while the series, in the overall ratings, never made the top thirty during its entire five-year run, it did respectably well.

At the end of the 1969–1970 season, That Girl was still doing moderately well in the ratings, but after four years Thomas had grown tired of the series and wanted to move on. ABC convinced her to do one more year. In the beginning of the fifth season, Don and Ann became engaged, but they never actually married. The decision to leave the couple engaged at the end of the run was largely the idea of Thomas. She did not want to send a message to young women that marriage was the ultimate goal for them, and she worried that it would have undercut the somewhat feminist message of the show.

Intro
Every episode started with a small cold open; the dialogue would always turn to Ann Marie, as one of the characters would make an assertive reference to her as "that girl"; the camera would freeze frame on a surprised Ann Marie. This was followed by the opening credits and theme music (written by Earle Hagen).  During the first four seasons, the theme song was instrumental only; in the fifth and final season, lyrics (written by Denoff) were added:

Diamonds, daisies, snowflakes,
That girl.
Chestnuts, rainbows, springtime...
Is that girl.
She's tinsel on a tree...
She's everything that every girl should be!
Sable, popcorn, white wine,
That girl
Gingham, bluebirds, Broadway...
Is that girl.
She's mine alone, but luckily for you...
If you find a girl to love,
Only one girl to love,
Then she'll be That Girl too...
That Girl!

Production notes
According to Marlo Thomas, she was approached by ABC executive Edgar Scherick, who saw her in a screen test for a failed pilot, but still wanted to feature her in a project. Scherick gave Thomas several scripts to read, none of which she liked, as they all focused on a woman who was either a traditional girlfriend, wife or secretary to someone else; Thomas wanted a show in which the main character was a young, modern woman focused on her own dreams and aspirations.

Although never officially credited as such (Persky and Denoff were the series' creators and official executive producers), Thomas was also a de facto executive producer of the series through her Daisy Productions, which she formed specifically for the series; it was credited on-screen as the production company. She originally wanted to name the sitcom Miss Independence, the nickname given to her by her parents.

Manhattan exterior shots were filmed in several days. The apartment - initially - was located off the East River on the Upper East Side, in the former East End Hotel (originally known as the Junior League Hotel for Working Women)  at 78th Street and the FDR Drive, as seen in several first season episodes, including "What's in a Name" where Ann Marie can be seen exiting a taxicab. In the episode entitled "Señorita," Ann Marie lists her address as 627 East 54th Street. In the second-season - with a new exterior -  in the episode "Nothing to Be Afreud of but Freud Himself", Donald gives out her address as 344 West 78th Street, Apartment D. Ann Marie's acting school was modeled after the Neighborhood Playhouse School of the Theatre on East 54th Street between First and Second Avenues. That Girl was filmed at Desilu-Cahuenga Studios (for many years called Ren-Mar Studios and now called Red Studios Hollywood), located at 846 North Cahuenga Boulevard in Hollywood.

Characters
 Ann Marie (Marlo Thomas), a beautiful young would-be actress from Brewster, New York, who moves to New York City in order to seek stardom, often tries to balance temporary jobs and auditions with having a boyfriend.
 Donald Hollinger (Ted Bessell), writer for NewsView magazine, who becomes Ann's boyfriend after meeting her working in the lobby of the building where he works.
 Lew Marie (Harold Gould pilot only; Lew Parker), Ann's father and the owner of the La Parisienne restaurant in Brewster, New York.
 Helen Marie (Penny Santon pilot only; Rosemary DeCamp), Ann's mother.
 Dr. Leon Bessemer (Dabney Coleman), a neighbor of Ann and an obstetrician.
 Judy Bessemer (Bonnie Scott), Leon's wife and Ann's neighbor, the first person Ann meets as she moves into her new apartment.
 Jerry Bauman (Bernie Kopell), a fellow employee of Donald's at NewsView magazine. After the first season, Jerry and Ruth lived next door to Ann in Apt. C.
 Margie Bauman (Arlene Golonka), Jerry's wife in the episode "Rain, Snow and Rice" in the first season.
Ruth Bauman (Carol Ann Daniels), Jerry's wife in the episode "There's Nothing to be Afreud of But Freud Himself" in the second season.
Ruth Bauman (Alice Borden), Jerry's wife beginning in the episode "Write is Wrong" in the fourth season.
 Margie "Pete" Peterson (Ruth Buzzi), a friend of Ann.
 Harvey Peck (Ronnie Schell), one of Ann's agents at the Gilliam and Norris Theatrical Agency.
 George Lester (George Carlin), another one of Ann's agents in a single episode.
 Mildred Hollinger (Mabel Albertson), Donald's mother.
 Bert Hollinger (George Cisar, later Frank Faylen), Donald's father.
 Jules Benedict (Billy De Wolfe), head of the Benedict Workshop of the Dramatic Arts.

Episodes

Five complete seasons of That Girl aired, with the series finale airing on March 19, 1971. Over the five seasons, a total of 136 episodes aired. Thomas' sister Terre, her brother Tony, and father Danny Thomas all appeared in a 1969 episode
called "My Sister's Keeper".

Pilot
The only episode never shown during the series' original network run was the pilot produced in 1965. The major differences were evident in its opening credits. Bessell's character was Don Blue Sky, Ann Marie's talent agent who was part Cherokee, and Harold Gould and Penny Santon played her parents. By the time the series aired on ABC, Thomas and Bessell were the only actors to receive top billing.

The pilot episode centered on Ann Marie's attempt to adopt a stage name based on her agent's suggestion. After her use of "Marie Brewster" (the names of her family and hometown combined) was met with disapproval from her parents, she decided to not make the change in the end. This storyline and numerous scenes were recycled into the 11th episode of Season 1 titled "What's in a Name?" from November 17, 1966.

The pilot was included in the 5-disc set of That Girl: Season One, which was released by Shout! Factory in 2006. It has since been added to the series' broadcast syndication package; it led off a New Year's Day marathon on MeTV at the start of 2012.

Syndication and home media
On January 1, 2012, That Girl reruns returned to national television on MeTV with episodes shown on weekday mornings and Sunday afternoons until September 1, 2013. On September 1, 2014, the show returned to MeTV. Reruns have previously aired on TV Land from the network's launch in 1996 to 1998.  The series is distributed by CBS Television Distribution.  Beginning January 2, 2020, the show currently airs on Antenna TV. As of 2020, the series is available on Tubi and Amazon Prime.

Shout! Factory has released all five seasons on DVD in Region 1. Each release contains extensive bonus features including episodic promos, featurettes, commentary tracks and the original pilot episode.

In Region 4, Madman Entertainment has released all five seasons on DVD in Australia/New Zealand. On April 21, 2010, Madman released That Girl: The Complete Series, a 21-disc box set that features all 136 episodes, as well as extensive bonus features.

Novel
 Paul W. Fairman, That Girl, New York: Popular Library, 1971. 125 pp.
Newly engaged Ann travels to Maine to take the role of Cathy in a production of Wuthering Heights but finds herself embroiled in a real-life gothic.

Spin-offs
In 1973, Rankin/Bass produced That Girl in Wonderland, an animated television special in which Marlo Thomas reprised the role of Ann Marie. It aired as an episode of The ABC Saturday Superstar Movie on January 13, 1973. The special also featured the voices of Patricia Bright, Dick Hehmeyer, Rhoda Mann, and Ted Schwartz.

Popular culture

The series' theme song and opening visuals have been parodied in pop culture several times. They appeared as a series of T-shirts, then as a Saturday Night Live skit featuring Danitra Vance in an African American remake "That Black Girl", and as a sequence on episodes of Animaniacs, The Simpsons, Family Guy, Clarissa Explains It All, Arthur, Friends and Roseanne.

It was also parodied in the cold opening of an episode of The Nanny where Maxwell's mother encounters Fran at the florist.

The 2011 advertising campaign for the launch of Fox's sitcom New Girl featured posters of that sitcom's star, Zooey Deschanel, in the make-up, pose and graphic look of Marlo Thomas from the original That Girl series.

An episode from Ugly Betty had Fabia forcing Wilhelmina Slater into making an exchange: she'll give up her wedding date to Wilhelmina in exchange for the services of Wilhelmina's assistant, Marc St. James, after Fabia evokes the opening lines.

In 1968, shortly after the feminist protest against bras and other feminine products at the Miss America pageant, Marlo Thomas began going braless on That Girl. "God created women to bounce," Thomas said. "So be it."

In season 7, episode 2 of Mad Men, episode 80 of That Girl ("There Was a Time Ann Met a Pie Man") which originally aired February 13, 1969 can be seen playing in Donald Draper's home.

An episode of Friends S3E9, "The One With the Football", the cast plays a game of touch football for the coveted Geller Cup. Phoebe is wearing a That Girl t-shirt during the game.

Further reading

 "Tuning in to Women in Television" (National Women's History Museum)

References

External links

 
 That Girl page on Shout! Factory

1966 American television series debuts
1971 American television series endings
1960s American sitcoms
1970s American sitcoms
1960s American workplace comedy television series
American Broadcasting Company original programming
English-language television shows
Television series by CBS Studios
Television shows set in New York City
Television series by Metromedia
Television series about actors